Mehmet Özal (born 31 October 1978 in Ankara, Turkey) is a Turkish wrestler in Greco-Roman style. He is member of the İstanbul Büyükşehir Belediyesi S.K.

He competed in the men's Greco-Roman 96 kg at the 2004 Summer Olympics and won the bronze medal.

At the World Championships he has won a bronze and a gold medal, in 2001 and 2002 respectively. He also won a bronze medal at the 2005 Mediterranean Games.

Achievements
 1998 World University Championships in Ankara, Turkey - bronze (97 kg)
 2000 European Championships in Moscow, Russia - bronze (97 kg)
 2000 World Military Championships in Camp Lejeune, NC, U.S. - gold (97 kg)
 2000 World University Championships in Tokyo, Japan - bronze (97 kg)
 2001 European Championships in Istanbul, Turkey - 5th (97 kg)
 2001 World Cup in Levallois-Perret, Paris, France - 4th (97 kg)
 2001 World Championships in Patras, Greece - bronze (97 kg)
 2002 European Championships in Seinäjoki, Finland - 14th (96 kg)
 2002 World Championships in Moscow, Russia - gold (96 kg)
 2003 European Championships in Belgrade, Serbia - 9th (96 kg)
 2003 World Championships in Créteil, Paris, France - 14th (96 kg)
 2004 Olympics in Athens, Greece - bronze (96 kg)
 2004 European Championships in Haparanda, Finland - 6th (96 kg)
 2005 Mediterranean Games in Almeria, Spain - bronze (96 kg)
 2007 Military Olympics in Hyderabad, India - gold (96 kg)

References

External links 
 

1978 births
Living people
Sportspeople from Ankara
Olympic wrestlers of Turkey
Wrestlers at the 2004 Summer Olympics
Wrestlers at the 2008 Summer Olympics
Olympic bronze medalists for Turkey
Olympic medalists in wrestling
Turkish male sport wrestlers
Medalists at the 2004 Summer Olympics
Mediterranean Games bronze medalists for Turkey
Competitors at the 2005 Mediterranean Games
Mediterranean Games medalists in wrestling
21st-century Turkish people